The  is a 12th-century Japanese dictionary of Kanji ("Chinese characters"). It was the first Heian Period dictionary to collate characters by pronunciation (in the iroha order) rather than by logographic radical (like the Tenrei Banshō Meigi) or word meaning (Wamyō Ruijushō). 

The Iroha Jiruishō has a complex history (see Okimori 1996:8-11) involving editions of two, three, and ten fascicles (kan 卷 "scroll; volume"). The original 2-fascicle edition was compiled by an unknown editor in late Heian era circa 1144-1165 CE. This was followed by a 3-fascicle edition by Tachibana Tadakane (橘忠兼) circa 1177-1188. Finally, at the start of the Kamakura Period, another anonymous editor compiled the expanded 10-fascicle edition, entitled 伊呂波字類抄 (with Iroha written 伊呂波 instead of 色葉).

The main character entries are annotated with katakana to indicate both on'yomi Sino-Japanese borrowings and kun'yomi native Japanese pronunciations. The Iroha Jiruishō orthography shows that 12th-century Japanese continued to phonetically distinguish voiceless and voiced sounds, but the distinction between /zi/ and /di/, /zu/ and /du/, and /eu/ and /ou/ was being lost. These entry words typify the Japanized version of classical Chinese known as hentai Kanbun (変体漢文 "anomalous Chinese writing", see Azuma Kagami) or Wakan konkōbun (和漢混交文 "mixed Japanese and Chinese writing"). This is a bilingual dictionary for looking up Chinese characters in terms of their Japanese pronunciation, and not a true Japanese language dictionary.

The Iroha jiruishō inventively groups entries by their first mora into 47 phonetic sections (部門) like i (伊), ro (呂), and ha (波); each subdivided into 21 semantic headings shown in the table below.

Most of these 21 headings are self-explanatory semantic fields, with the exceptions of 13 Jiji for miscellaneous words written with a single character, 14 Jūten reduplicative compounds (e.g., ji-ji 時時, literally "time time", "at times, occasionally"), and 15 Jōji synonym compounds (e.g., kanryaku 簡略, literally "simple simple", "simplicity, conciseness"). These 21 Iroha jiruishō headings can be compared with the 24 used two centuries earlier in the Wamyō Ruijushō.

Unlike all the other major Heian Japanese dictionaries that followed Chinese dictionary traditions, the Iroha Jiruishō'''s phonetic ordering can undoubtedly be interpreted, says Don C. Bailey (1960:16), "as a sign of increasing independence from Chinese cultural influences." Most subsequent Japanese dictionaries, excepting kanji ones, were internally organized by pronunciation.

References

Bailey, Don Clifford. (1960). "Early Japanese Lexicography". Monumenta Nipponica 16:1-52.
Nakada Norio 中田祝夫, ed. (1977). Iroha jirui shō kenkyū narabini sōgō sakuin (色葉字類抄研究並びに總合索引 "Research and a General Index for the Iroha Jiruishō). Tokyo : Kazama Shobō.
Kaneko Akira 金子彰. (1996). "色葉字類抄・伊呂波字類抄 (Iroha Jiruishō)". In Nihon jisho jiten 日本辞書辞典 (The Encyclopedia of Dictionaries Published in Japan), Okimori Takuya 沖森卓也, et al., eds., pp. 8-11. Tokyo: Ōfū. 

External links
色葉字類抄, online JPEG Iroha Jiruishō'' edition, Kyoto University Library
Manuscript scan at Waseda University Library: 1827

Japanese dictionaries
Late Old Japanese texts
12th-century Japanese books
Heian-period books